Ferula narthex is a species of plant native to Afghanistan, Tajikistan, northern Pakistan and the Western Himalayan region of Pakistan. Although it is often listed as the source of asafoetida, one report stated that its essential oil lacked sulfur-containing compounds which are characteristic of asafoetida.

References 

narthex
Flora of Afghanistan
Flora of Tajikistan
Flora of Pakistan